Hendry Alexander Córdova Martínez (born 11 June 1984 in San Pedro Sula, Honduras) is a Honduran footballer who currently plays as a midfielder for Olimpia in the Honduran National League.

Club career
He spent the majority of his career at Platense. In February 2009, Córdova went on trial to Chinese side Beijing Guoan but the club decided not to sign him. In March 2010 Córdova was among four teammates who were seriously injured in a car accident after leaving training, breaking his right thigh.

Career statistics

International career
Córdoba made his debut for Honduras in an April 2012 friendly match against Costa Rica and has, as of December 2012, earned a total of 1 cap, scoring no goals.

References

External links

1984 births
Living people
People from San Pedro Sula
Association football midfielders
Honduran footballers
Honduras international footballers
Platense F.C. players
C.D. Olimpia players
Liga Nacional de Fútbol Profesional de Honduras players